Kifissia or Kifisia (also Kephisia or Cephissia;) is one of the most expensive northern suburbs of Athens, Greece, mainly accessed via Kifissias Avenue, running all the way from central Athens up to Theseos Avenue in the suburb of Nea Erythraia. It has traditionally been home to rich Greek families and major Greek political families.

Municipality
The municipality Kifisia was formed at the 2011 local government reform by the merger of the following 3 former municipalities, that became municipal units:
Ekali
Kifisia
Nea Erythraia

The municipality has an area of 35.100 km2, the municipal unit 25.937 km2.

Geography

Kifisia is situated in central Attica, at the western end of the forested Penteli mountain range. The small river Kifisos forms the western border of the municipality. Kifisia is situated 12 km northeast of Athens city centre. The built-up area of Kifisia is continuous with those of the neighbouring suburbs Lykovrysi, Nea Erythraia, Marousi and Pefki. Kifisia consists of the following neighbourhoods: Adames, Ano Kifisia, Kato Kifisia, Kefalari, Nea Kifisia and Politeia (or Politia). It is a green suburb with many parks and tree-lined streets.

The main thoroughfare is Kifisias Avenue, which connects Kifisia with central Athens and the northern beltway Motorway 6. The Kifisia station is the north terminus of Athens Metro Line 1.

History

Antiquity

Cephisia was a deme of ancient Athens. It was the home of the famous dramatist Menander (circa 342-291 BC). 
Cephisia had become a famous retreat of philosophers during the reign of the Roman emperor Hadrian, when the wealthy Herodes Atticus of Marathon, Greece built the Villa Cephisia. In his Attic Nights, Aulus Gellius describes the unique ambiance of intellectual ferment and aristocratic leisure in an idyllic setting which he created there. It was also the practice of Herodes to provide free instruction in philosophy for selected youths from Athens. 
The remains of some of his family funeral monuments lie at the centre of the town in Platonas Square. He also beautified a sanctuary to the Nymphs in the ravine of Kokkinara, in the nearby district of Kefalari.

Medieval period 

The history of Kifisia during the medieval period is obscure, but the remains of a monastery church dedicated to the Virgin of the Swallow (Panagia Chelidonas) is associated with a story about a battle fought there between local people and unspecified "invaders". This chapel is a rare example of a monastery church originally provided with a fireplace, for the chimney remains.

Ottoman Era

During Ottoman period, in 1667, Kifisia was visited by the Turkish traveler Evliya Çelebi. He described a small country town set in a fertile plain of paradisaic beauty, with three hundred tile-roofed houses. Half the inhabitants of the town were Muslims and half were Christians. He records that there was a single mosque, without a minaret, and many small Christian chapels - some of which survive today.

Post Greek Independence

The temperature in Kifisia tends to be significantly lower than that of the city,  so following the independence of Greece, it quickly became a summer resort of the ruling class of the new state.

The village was home to an Arvanitika speaking community, however due to its proximity to Athens, it has undergone a language shift. The popularity of Kifissia faded somewhat during the middle of the nineteenth century when the danger of raids by brigands who infested the nearby mountains was very real. However, the suppression of brigandage, and the arrival of the railway in 1885, led to the dramatic development of the area.

It became the fashion for wealthy Athenian families to build summer houses in Kifisia, and keen social competition led to the creation of a unique architectural ambiance, as villas in ever more exotic styles proliferated. For those unable to afford a summer house, many hotels were built, where the slightly less affluent could spend the holiday months rubbing shoulders with their social betters.

The heyday of Kifisia was probably during the inter-war period, when the leaders of the two main rival political parties frequented different hotels in the town together with their most important supporters.

World War II and Civil War

Following the liberation of Greece from German occupation in 1944, the British Royal Air Force ill-advisedly made its headquarters in Kefalari, taking over several hotels. With the outbreak of the Greek Civil War, the RAF personnel were first besieged, then forced to surrender, and marched across the mountains into northern Greece; being released in Trikala only after a truce had been arranged.

Museums 
The Goulandris Museum of Natural History is situated in the heart of Kifissia and has collections from the natural wildlife of the Greek territory.

Economy
Accenture, Aegean Airlines, Barcleys, BP, Eurobank Ergasias, Eltrak, Ellaktor, Kioleides, Ferrari Metaxa, Metro S.A., Walmart, and Volvo have their head office in Kifisia.

Sports

Kifissia has several sport clubs in different sports. From them, most notable are ZAON, club with many Panhellenic titles in Greek women volleyball, Kifissia AC that plays almost constantly in men volleyball first division (A1 Ethniki) and Nea Kifissia B.C. that plays in basketball first division (Greek Basket League). The football team of Kifissia is Kifissia F.C., and plays in Football League 2 (third division). Kifissia also is the seat of Athina 90 (most times winner in Futsal League), AOH Hymettus (most times winner in Field Hockey League), and Iraklis Kifissias Presence in A1 Womans Category, with more than 200 athletes in Iraklis Kifissias Volleyball Academy.

Historical population
The population grew fast between 1991-2001 by 18,3% while in 2001-2011 the percentage was lower, 7.13%

Notable people
Menander (circa 342-291 BC), dramatist, born in Kifisia
Emmanuel Benakis, merchant and politician, died in Kifisia
Andreas Empeirikos (1901 in Romania - August 3, 1975), poet, died in Kifisia
Penelope Delta (1874 Alexandria – 27 April 1941)
Theodoros Pangalos, general, died in Kifisia
Themistoklis Sophoulis, politician, died in Kifisia
Evgenios Spatharis (1924–2009), shadow theatre artist, born in Kifisia

References

External links
Official website 

Municipalities of Attica
Populated places in North Athens (regional unit)
Shopping districts and streets in Greece
Acropolis Rally
Arvanite settlements